This is a list of awards and nominations that was received by Indian actor Mithun Chakraborty.

National Film Awards

Filmfare Awards

Filmfare Awards East

Screen Awards

IIFA Awards

BFJA Awards

Zee Cine Awards

Anandalok Awards

Stardust Awards

Annual Central European Bollywood Awards

Apsara Awards

Star Jahlsa Awards

Ghanta Awards

References

	
Mithun Chakraborty